The Division of Aston is an Australian Federal Electoral Division in the state of Victoria. The division is located in the eastern suburbs of Melbourne, coextensive with the City of Knox local government area. The suburbs in the division include Bayswater, Boronia, Ferntree Gully, Knoxfield, Rowville, Scoresby, The Basin, Wantirna and Wantirna South; and parts of Lysterfield, Sassafras and Upper Ferntree Gully.

Geography
Since 1984, federal electoral division boundaries in Australia have been determined at redistributions by a redistribution committee appointed by the Australian Electoral Commission. Redistributions occur for the boundaries of divisions in a particular state, and they occur every seven years, or sooner if a state's representation entitlement changes or when divisions of a state are malapportioned.

History

The division was created in 1984 and is named after Tilly Aston, a blind writer and teacher who helped found the Library of the Victorian Association of Braille Writers in 1894.

The most recent member for Aston, since the 2010 federal election, was Alan Tudge, a member of the Liberal Party of Australia who served as a minister in the Morrison Government and resigned on 17 February 2023. His replacement will be chosen in the 2023 Aston by-election to be held on 1 April 2023.

A classic "mortgage belt" seat, it was held by the Australian Labor Party until 1990, but since then it has been held by the Liberal Party. At the 2022 Australian federal election it was the Liberal Party’s safest seat in metropolitan Melbourne.

Members

Election results

References

External links
 Division of Aston - Australian Electoral Commission
 Alan Tudge they vote for YOU

Electoral divisions of Australia
Constituencies established in 1984
1984 establishments in Australia
City of Knox
Electoral districts and divisions of Greater Melbourne